Profumo is the eighth album by Gianna Nannini. It was released in 1986.

In the wake of the international acclaim that followed her previous album, "Puzzle", "Profumo" was released throughout Europe, South America, South Africa, Australia, South Korea and Japan, selling over 1,000,000 copies.

Track listing

"Bello e Impossibile" (Nannini-Pianigiani/Nannini) – 4:40
"Profumo" (Nannini-Pianigiani/Nannini) - 3:50
"Come una Schiava" (Nannini/Nannini-Riva) – 5:11
"Gelosia" (Nannini-Plank-Pianigiani/Nannini-Riva) - 3:05
"Seduzione" (Nannini-Pianigiani/Nannini-Riva) – 3:29
"Quale Amore" (Nannini-Pianigiani/Nannini) – 5:08
"Avventuriera" (Nannini-Pianigiani/Nannini-Riva) – 4:04
"Quante Mani" (Nannini-Pianigiani/Nannini-Riva) - 3:31
"Terra Straniera" (Nannini-Pianigiani/Nannini) - 6:14

Personnel 
Gianna Nannini - Vocals, keyboards, guitars
Fabio Pianigiani - Guitars, keyboards
Rolf Lammers - Organ, keyboards
Rainer Herzog - Keyboards
Hans Bäär - Bass
Rüdiger Braune - Drums
Conny Plank - Percussion, sequencer
Nikko Weidmann - Bass Synth.
Martin Doepke - Bass Arr.
Rudy Spinello - Guitars
Gino Lattuca - Trumpet
Rüdiger Baldauf - Trumpet
George Mayer - Saxophone
Reto Mandelkow - Alto sax
Jürgen Hiekel - Tenor sax
Gina Di Maio - Choir
Fabiana De Geronimo - Choir
Gloria Campoluongo - Choir
Production: Conny Plank, Gianna Nannini
Executive producer: Peter Zumsteg
Engineer: Detlef Wiederhoff

Additional infos
Cover photography: Alberto Venzago
Artwork: Hans Inauen
Styling: Carla Guido, Moschino, Puma, Lily Farouche
Recorded Spring 1986 at Conny's Studio, Neunkichen/Cologne, Germany

Certifications

External links
 Gianna Nannini homepage

References

1986 albums
Gianna Nannini albums
Polydor Records albums
Albums produced by Conny Plank
Italian-language albums